Vergani Racing is an auto racing team based in Italy.

References

External links
No official website

Italian auto racing teams

World Series Formula V8 3.5 teams